Joyce Akosua Twene also known as Joyce Blessing is a Ghanaian and African gospel musician.

Early life and education 
Joyce Akosua Twene known popularly as Joyce Blessing was born to Mr Christopher Kwabena Twene and Mrs Gladys Yaa Kyewaa on 15 May at Accra, Ghana. Joyce is the fourth child of her parents. She grew up with other siblings who were all raised by their mother in Kumasi, the Ashanti Region of Ghana where she had her primary school and Junior High School education .

Music career 
Joyce  had always had an endearment for music and hence started singing in the church at an early age of 14 and also made sure she never missed musical concerts held at her vicinity when she was young even when her mother tried to prevent her from attending these functions.

Joyce has arguably disabused the stigmatized notion that gospel musicians are inactive on stage. She sharpened her live performance artistry when she was part of the “See Them Band” group in Kumasi. She was the youngest among them.  She played for five years in addition to being a backing vocalist for the likes of  Evangelist Diana Asamoah, Jewel Ackah, Mary Ghansah, Ernest Opoku Jnr, Aseibu Amanfi and other musicians in Ghana.

Joyce started ministry in 2007 with showbiz name Joyce Tuffuor and recorded her first album, dubbed "Obi Ntu Nyame Fo", which translates to English as "Nobody Advises God".

Joyce shot to fame in the year 2013 with a new showbiz name Joyce Blessing. She unleashed her song "Monko Moakyi", a single from her Heavy Price album which has become one of her most popular songs.  The album included other hits, such as Kantamanto Nyame, Blessed Be The Lord, and Nyame Aguamma.  This was under the management of Media Excel Productions in collaboration with DaveJoy Productions.  Blessing won six awards at the Ghana Gospel Industry Awards, organized by Adom FM.

She also made her first entry into the ultimate Ghana Music Awards in 2014 where she grabbed nominations for  Gospel Song of the Year, Best Female Vocal Performance, Gospel Artiste of the Year, Album of the Year and Best Collaboration of the Year categories, with her “Heavy Price” album which she won the Best Gospel Album of the year with Heavy Price.

In April 2017 SHE released her album 'AGYEBUM' which earned her several nominations in the 2017 National Gospel Awards where she won the Best Praise Song of the Year Award  and again won an award at the 2017 4syte Music Video Awards for the Best Gospel Music Video of the Year  with her visuals shot for the “Lord’s Prayer single”.

In 2018, Blessing took the lead among other gospel musicians in Ghana with copping nominations in all awards organized in Ghana.  She recently won the Gospel artiste of the year at Ghana Entertainment Awards USA, Ghana Music Awards South Africa Gospel Artiste of the Year and grabbed three awards at the recent BAMA Awards in Ghana, making a sum of 22 awards copped in just five years in ministry, an achievement no Ghanaian gospel musician has been able to attain so far.

She again grabbed nominations for Gospel Song of the year and Gospel Artiste of the Year at the Vodafone Ghana Music Awards, three Music Awards and more.

In 2019, Blessing has nominations for Hippo Music Awards based in Uganda and six nominations at  MAWA 2019 in Nigeria and won an award with her latest Repent single at Maranatha Global Worship Music Awards In Kenya.

She currently has 24 awards and six albums to her credit.

As part of her gospel ministry, she has set up a charity foundation which  donates to the deaf and blind, accident victims, and mentally challenged people in Ghanaian society.

Awards and nominations

Discography

Albums

Major Singles 
Monko Mo Akyi
Mensei Da
Heavy Price
I Swerve You

References 

Living people
Ghanaian women singers
Ghanaian gospel singers
Year of birth missing (living people)